Dean Slaugh (March 29, 1929 – April 13, 2009) was an American paralympic archer. He competed at the 1964 Summer Paralympics.

Biography 
Slaugh was born in Vernal, Utah, and later lived in Garden Grove, California. He was injured in the Korean War. He competed in the archery events at the 1964 Summer Paralympics. Slaugh won individual gold medals in the albion round open event and FITA round open event. He was also a member of the gold-winning teams in the albion round team open event (with Dick Robinson and Jack Whitman), and the FITA round team open event (with Jim Mathis and Jack Whitman).

References

External links 

1929 births
2009 deaths
People from Vernal, Utah
People with paraplegia
American male archers
Archers at the 1964 Summer Paralympics
Medalists at the 1964 Summer Paralympics
Paralympic medalists in archery
Paralympic archers of the United States
Paralympic gold medalists for the United States
United States Army personnel of the Korean War
20th-century American people